South Carolina Highway 97 (SC 97) is a  state highway in the U.S. state of South Carolina. The highway connects Camden, Great Falls, Chester, and Hickory Grove.

Route description
SC 97 begins at an intersection with U.S. Route 521 (US 521)/US 601 (Broad Street) in Camden within Kershaw County, northeast of the Camden Country Club. The highway travels to the northwest and meets US 521 Truck/US 601 Truck (Boykin Road) just before leaving the city limits of Camden. It travels through rural areas of the county, crosses over part of Lake Wateree, and enters Liberty Hill. There, it has an intersection with the western terminus of SC 522 (Stoneboro Road). A short distance later, it enters Lancaster County. It continues traveling through rural areas until it intersects SC 200 (Great Falls Highway). The two highways travel concurrently to the west. Almost immediately, they cross over the Catawba River on the Tom G. Mangum Bridge, where they enter Chester County. This bridge is just south of the Fishing Creek Dam. Just after the bridge, the concurrency intersects US 21, which joins them. Immediately, they enter Great Falls. SC 97 departs the concurrency and travels along the northern edge of the city limits of the town until it intersects SC 99 (Chester Avenue). Immediately, they travel to the northwest and split. It intersects SC 901 (Mountain Gap Road) just before an interchange with Interstate 77 (I-77).

Just before entering Chester, SC 97 passes Old Purity Cemetery and the Chester County Hospital. It then intersects US 321 (Columbia Road), which begins a concurrency with the highway. A short distance later, US 321 splits off at an intersection with US 321 Bus./SC 9/SC 72/SC 121 (J.A. Cochran Bypass), northeast of Chester High School. SC 9/SC 72/SC 97/SC 121 travels along the bypass to the northeast. At Lancaster Highway, SC 9 departs the concurrency to the east, and SC 9 Bus. travels to the west. The concurrency enters Eureka Mill. At Saluda Road, SC 72/SC 121 departs to the northeast, while SC 97 continues to the north-northwest. It curves to the west and briefly leaves the city limits of Eureka Mill. After the highway curves to the southwest, it enters Chester. At Center Street, it begins a concurrency with US 321 Bus. The highways travel to the northwest and leave Chester. They cross over the Sandy River just before intersecting US 321. Here, the business route ends, and SC 97 continues to the northwest, winding its way through mostly wooded areas. A short distance after entering York County, it intersects SC 322 (W. McConnells Highway). Just over  later, it meets SC 49 (Lockhart Road). It crosses over Bullock Creek on an unnamed bridge. The highway curves to the north and then to the northeast before entering Hickory Grove. Immediately, there is an intersection with SC 211 (Smithford Road). The two highways travel concurrently into downtown and split at Wylie Avenue. The highway travels in a northerly direction and enters Smyrna. Just before leaving the city limits of Smyrna, SC 97 enters Cherokee County. The road travels through Kings Creek and meets its northern terminus, an intersection with SC 5 (York Highway).

Major intersections

Chester business loop

South Carolina Highway 97 Business (SC 97 Bus.) was a business route that was established between 1981 and 1987 as a renumbering of the SC 97 mainline through the main part of Chester. It was concurrent with U.S. Route 321 Business (US 321 Bus.). Between 2006 and 2009, SC 97 Bus. was decommissioned.

See also

References

External links

SC 97 South Carolina Highway Annex
Former SC 97 Business South Carolina Highway Annex

097
Transportation in Kershaw County, South Carolina
Transportation in Lancaster County, South Carolina
Transportation in Chester County, South Carolina
Transportation in York County, South Carolina
Transportation in Cherokee County, South Carolina